Cape Longing is a rocky cape on the east coast of Graham Land, Antarctica, forming the south end of a large ice-covered promontory which marks the west side of the south entrance to Prince Gustav Channel. It was discovered by the Swedish Antarctic Expedition under Otto Nordenskiöld in 1902, and so named by him because from the position of his winter hut on Snow Hill Island the cape lay in the direction of his "land of longing" which he was anxious to explore.

It was roughly charted by Nordenskiöld, and named after the cape by the UK Antarctic Place-Names Committee (UK-APC) following British Antarctic Survey geological work in the area in 1987–88.

The gap is used to avoid the long detour around the cape. It was mapped from surveys by the Falkland Islands Dependencies Survey in 1960–61, and named by the UK-APC in association with the cape.

Florentino Ameghino Refuge 

Refuge Florentino Ameghino is an Antarctic refuge located on Cape Longing in the Trinity Peninsula, at the northern tip of the Antarctic Peninsula. The refuge was inaugurated on October 10, 1960 and is administered by the Argentine Army.
It is one of the 18 shelters that are under the responsibility of the Esperanza Base, which is responsible for the maintenance and the care tasks. The National Antarctic Directorate reports that the refuge is inactive. Its name pays homage to Florentino Ameghino.

See also
 List of Antarctic field camps

References

Headlands of Graham Land
Nordenskjöld Coast